Amanda Annan is an English actress, model, writer and entrepreneur known for starring in Rag Tag (2006) and Dolly Unachukwu's The Empire (2005), and producing the documentaries Jambo Jumbo (2010) and Equation of Change (2010) with Richard Branson.

Early life 
Amanda Annan was born in 1982 to a Ghanaian father and a Martinican mother. She was adopted as a child and raised in London. Her uncle is former Secretary-General of the United Nations Kofi Annan. Amanda Annan attended the Royal Academy of Dramatic Art when she was 16. Her decision to become a model came as a surprise to her family, many of whom were politicians and diplomats.

Career 
While studying at the Royal Academy of Dramatic Art, she was scouted for a modelling agency and did her first modelling shoot for a Vidal Sassoon campaign. She appeared in advertisements for Revlon, Ebel and Woolworths Group. She was featured on the cover of Elle, Vogue and Photo Magazine, and appeared in publications like Telegraph Magazine and the South African magazine Drum.

She studied acting at the Lee Strasberg Theatre and Film Institute in Los Angeles, and starred in the 2006 drama film Rag Tag and Dolly Unachukwu's The Empire (2005). She also had a role in Natale a Beverly Hills (titled "Christmas in Beverly Hills" in English) (2009). She later founded the production company Great Light Entertainment.

Amanda Annan was the producer and host of the 2010 documentary Jambo Jumbo (2010), about the Maasai Mara in Kenya. The film was narrated by Richard Branson, with whom she also produced the documentary Equation of Change (2010).

She wrote, directed and produced the 2013 television series Celebville360 and was executive producer of the 2014 reality webseries The Diary of a Nigerian Wife through Great Light Entertainment. In 2020 she appeared in Gregory Hatanaka's Body of Night and appeared in the comedy film Acrylic. Both films were co-directed by Nicole D'Angelo.

Writing 
In 2021, Annan published Win the Runway. LAWeekly described the book as "a guidebook for young models". Evan Arryoro of Gotham called it a "concise book that talks about the good, the bad and the ugly of the modeling and fashion industry."

Other work 
Amanda co-founded Evolution Extensions with Judi Shekoni. Annan also founded Elicina Europe and DNA Hair USA. In 2019, she became Senior Vice President of Miko Beauty.

Annan has hosted the podcast Beauty and the Beat since 2020. The podcast discusses topics like the beauty industry, mental health, body positivity, and politics.

Personal life 
Annan co-founded Etcetera, a non-profit which supports women's education, with a fellow volunteer she met while filming in Kenya with Richard Branson. She is actively involved with CAMFED, a non-profit organization that promotes the education of girls in Africa. Annan was an ambassador for One Laptop per Child. According to Nigerian Tribune, she has also raised funds for the African Film Commission.

References 

21st-century Ghanaian actresses
1982 births
Living people
Adoptees
Ghanaian expatriates in the United Kingdom
English people of Martiniquais descent
English people of Ghanaian descent
Ghanaian female models
Alumni of RADA
Lee Strasberg Theatre and Film Institute alumni